Pevcheskaya Tower is a water tower in Pushkin, near St. Petersburg (Russia). 
The tower was constructed based on the design of architect  as one of two towers of the Taitsky waterpipe. 
In addition to the basic function as a water tower, the first power station in Russia also operated there since the tower's construction. 
During the Second World War it suffered severe damage.

At the end of the 20th and the beginning of the 21st centuries restoration work took place.
On March 15, 2005 there was a fire, after which the tower has not been restored.
From 2009 is in renovation within project led by Gutsait Group (Saint Petersburg)

References 

Buildings and structures in Pushkin
Towers completed in 1887
Water towers in Russia
Towers in Saint Petersburg
Cultural heritage monuments of federal significance in Saint Petersburg